The Ambassador Extraordinary and Plenipotentiary of Ukraine to Belarus is the ambassador of Ukraine to Belarus.

The first Ukrainian ambassador to Belarus assumed his post in 1992, the same year a Ukrainian embassy opened in Minsk.

List of representatives
 Volodymyr Zheliba (1992-1998)
 Anatoly Dron (1998-2003)
 Petro Shapoval (2003-2005)
 Valentyn Nalyvaichenko (2005-2006)
 Igor Likhovy (2006-2010)
 Roman Bezsmertnyi (2010-2011)
 Viktor Tykhonov (2011 - 2012)
 Viktor Yakubov (2012-2013), Chargé d'Affaires ad interim
 Mykhailo Yezhel (2013-2015)

Valery Dzhyhun (2015-2017), Chargé d'affaires
 Ihor Kyzym (2017-)

See also 
 Embassy of Belarus, Kyiv
 Embassy of Ukraine, Minsk
 Belarus Ambassador to Ukraine

References

External links 
  Embassy of Ukraine to Belarus: Previous Ambassadors

Ambassadors of Ukraine to Belarus
Belarus
Ukraine